The 7 Metre was a sailing event on the Sailing at the 1908 Summer Olympics program in Ryde.  Three races were scheduled. Each nation could enter up to 2 boats. 5 sailors, on 2 boats, from 1 nation registered for competition.

Race schedule

Course area  
The following course was used during the 1908 Olympic 7-Metre regattas in all three races:
 Start at Ryde Pier
 №2. Mother Bank Buoy
 East Measured Mile Buoy
 East Sturbridge Buoy
 Finish at Ryde Pier

Weather conditions

Final results 
The 1908 Olympic scoring system was used.

Notes 
Two 7-Metre yachts were registered for the regattas of the 1908 Olympics. However, only one, Heroine, was present at the starting line. So she had each race a 'sail over'. Each match was therefore shortened to one round. After 2 matches Heroine was certain of the victory and no third match was sailed.

Other information

Extra award 
 Gilt commemorative medal:
 Charles Rivett-Carnac owner of Heroine

Further reading

References 

7 Metre
7 Metre